Formal, written proclamations issued by the First Presidency or Quorum of the Twelve Apostles of the Church of Jesus Christ of Latter-day Saints have been issued on six occasions, most recently April 5, 2020. They are similar to yet distinct from other official statements such as official declarations, doctrinal positions, epistles, and testimonies.

References

External links
 Text of 1841 proclamation
 Text of 1845 proclamation
 Text of 1865 proclamation
 Text of 1980 proclamation
 Text of 1995 proclamation
 Text of 2020 proclamation

Latter Day Saint statements of faith
The Church of Jesus Christ of Latter-day Saints texts
Proclamations
Religious proclamations
Proclamations
Proclamations
proclamations
Works by apostles (LDS Church)